The Supreme Court of Uruguay is the highest court of law and last resort in the Oriental Republic of Uruguay. It serves as the highest appeals court, and appoints and oversees all other judges. Established on 28 October 1907, it is housed in the Palacio Piria, a masterpiece of eclectic architecture from 1917.

Article 235 of the Constitution establishes that the members of the Supreme Court of Justice must be at least 40 years old, be natural-born citizens (or be legal citizens with ten years exercise thereof and twenty-five years of residence in the country), and have been a lawyer for ten years, or as such to have been a member of the Judiciary, the Public or Fiscal Ministry for a period of eight years. Article 236 establishes shall be appointed by the General Assembly by a two-thirds vote of its full membership. Also, the term-length will be ten years and they may not be re-elected until after a period of five years following the previous term. Additionally, the position shall cease when they reach the age of seventy years.

Powers and duties 
According to Article 329 to the Supreme Court is assigned:

 Judge all violators of the Constitution, without exception; offenses against the law of nations and cases in admiralty; questions relating to treaties, pacts and conventions with other States; and take cognizance of cases involving diplomatic Representatives in such cases as are contemplated in international law.
 Exercise directive, corrective, advisory, and economic supervision over the Tribunals, Courts and other dependencies of the Judiciary.
 Prepare the draft budgets of the Judicial Power and transmit them in due course to the Executive Power for inclusion in the draft of the general budget, together with such modifications as may be deemed appropriate.
 With the approval of the Senate, or during its recess with that of the Permanent Commission, appoint the citizens who shall compose the Appellate Tribunals, such appointments to be contingent upon the following: a favorable vote of three of its members, for candidates who belong to the Judiciary or the Public Ministry; A favorable vote of four, for candidates not having the qualifications of the foregoing paragraph.
 Appoint the Lawyer Judges of all grades and classes, an absolute majority of all members of the Supreme Court being required in each case.
 Appoint the permanent Official Defenders and Justices of the Peace by absolute majority of all members of the Supreme Court of Justice.
 Appoint, promote, or remove, by a vote of four of its members, the employees of the Judicial Power, in accordance with the provisions of Articles 58 to 66, wherever pertinent.
 Perform such other duties as the law may prescribe.

Membership

Former members

References

External links
 Uruguayan Judiciary

Uruguay
Government of Uruguay
Judiciary of Uruguay
Courts and tribunals established in 1907
Organizations established in 1907
1907 establishments in Uruguay